John Coyne (born 1937) is an American writer. He is the author of more than 25 nonfiction and fiction books, including a number of horror novels, and his short stories have been collected in "best of" anthologies such as Modern Masters of Horror and The Year's Best Fantasy and Horror. A former Peace Corps volunteer and a lifelong lover of golf, he has edited and written books dealing with both subjects, including The Caddie Who Knew Ben Hogan, The Caddie Who Played With Hickory, and The Caddie Who Won the Masters. His most recent book is the love story Long Ago and Far Away.

Life
Coyne was born in Chicago, Illinois. At age ten he began working as a caddie at Midlothian Country Club. Both his parents were from the west of Ireland; his father was from a remote area, and had spoken only the Irish language until he was about twelve. As a result, Coyne grew up with bedtime stories of Ireland, on which he would later draw for his Dungeons and Dragons-influenced novel Hobgoblin.

After graduating from Saint Louis University, he earned a master's in English at Western Michigan University, served in the Air Force, and served in the Peace Corps from 1962 to 1964, teaching English at the Commercial School in Addis Ababa, Ethiopia. He currently lives in Pelham Manor, New York, with his wife and son, where he works in communications and edits PeaceCorpsWriters.org.

Writing career
Coyne became one of modern horror fiction's "brand name" writers with the publication of his first novel, The Piercing, in 1979. He followed this with a number of other horror novels, including bestsellers such as The Legacy and Hobgoblin, before cutting back on genre writing in the mid-1980s. His short stories have been collected in a number of "best of" anthologies, including Modern Masters of Horror and The Year's Best Fantasy and Horror.

The Caddie Who Knew Ben Hogan, was published in 2006 and is a literary exploration of golf and everyday life. Norman Rush praised the novel, saying, "John Coyne has managed to employ golf as a lens through which aspects of Midwestern daily life in the 1940s, of thwarted love, of social class, are revealed with stark and unsettling clarity."

Coyne is the author of two other golf novels: The Caddie Who Played With Hickory, which is set in 1946 at the Midlothian Country Club, and The Caddie Who Won the Masters, set at Augusta National. His most recent novel is Long Ago and Far Away, a love story spanning forty years.

Bibliography

Novels

 The Piercing, New York: G.P. Putnam’s Sons, 1979
 The Legacy, NY: Berkeley, 1979 
 The Searing, NY: G.P. Putnam’s Sons, 1980 
 Hobgoblin, NY: G.P. Putnam’s Sons, 1981  
 The Shroud, NY: Berkley, 1983
 Brothers & Sisters, NY: Dutton, 1986 
 The Hunting Season, NY: Macmillan, 1987 
 Fury, NY: Warner Books, 1989  
 Child of Shadows, NY: Warner Books, 1990 
 The Caddie Who Knew Ben Hogan, Thomas Dunne Books, 2006; paperback, St. Martin's Griffin, 2007 
 The Caddie Who Played With Hickory, Thomas Dunne Books, 2008; paperback, St. Martin's Griffin, 2009

Selected short stories
 "Cabin in the Woods", Alfred Hitchcock's Mystery Magazine, July 1976. Reprinted in Modern Masters of Horror (1988).
 "The Crazy Chinaman", published in The Dodd Mead Gallery of Horror, ed. Charles L. Grant, 1983. Reprinted in Gallery of Horror by Stephen King, Charles L. Grant, 1997.
 "Snow Man", published in Monsters in Our Midst, ed. Robert Bloch, 1993. Reprinted in  The Year's Best Fantasy and Horror: Seventh Annual Collection (1994).
 "The Ecology of Reptiles", published in Predators, ed. Ed Gorman & Martin H. Greenberg, 1993. reprinted in The Year's Best Fantasy and Horror: Seventh Annual Collection (1994).

Anthologies
 Ellery Queen's Crookbook, Random House, 1974 (contributor)* Ellery Queen's Crookbook, Random House 1974 First John Coyne publication, per editor's note. Fiction anthology
 Alfred Hitchcock's Tales to Take Your Breath Away, NY: Dial Press, 1977 (contributor)
 Hitchcock's Anthology, 1977 (contributor)
 The Berkley Showcase: New Writings in Science Fiction and Fantasy, no date (contributor)
 Modern Masters Of Horror, Coward, McCann & Geoghegan, 1981 (contributor)
 Dodd Mead Gallery Of Horror, 1983 (contributor)
 The Second Black Lizard Anthology of Crime Fiction, 1988 (contributor)
 Masques IV, Pulphouse Publishing, 1993 (contributor)
 Monsters in Our Midst, Tor, 1993 (contributor)
 Predators, Roc, 1993 (contributor)
 The Year's Best Fantasy & Horror (contributor), St. Martin's Press, 1994
 Gallery of Horror (contributor), Penguin Group, 1997.
 Living on the Edge: Fiction by Peace Corps Writers, editor and contributor, Curbstone Press, 1999

Selected Nonfiction
 Letters from the Peace Corps (contributor), Washington: Robert B. Luce, Inc., 1964
 Better Golf, Follett, 1972
 This Way Out: A Guide to Alternatives to Traditional College Education in the United States, Europe and the Third World, with Tom Hebert, NY: Dutton, 1972 (co-author)
 Getting Skilled: A Guide to Private Trade and Technical Schools, with Tom Hebert, NY: Dutton, 1972 (co-author)
 New Golf For Women, NY: Doubleday, 1973
 By Hand: A Guide to Schools and Careers in Crafts, with Tom Hebert, NY: Dutton, 1974 (co-author)
 Listing removed to "Anthologies" section above. See notes appended. Fiction anthology, first Coyne story publication (Anthology title corrected)
 Playing with the Pros: Golf Instruction from the Senior Tour, NY: Dutton, 1990
 Peace Corps Writers Talk About Their Craft: Talking with... (21 Interviews), Rochester, NY: RPCV Writers & Readers, 1992 (Editor)
 Going Up Country, Travel Essays by Peace Corps Writers, Scribner's, 1994 (editor)
 To Touch the World: The Peace Corps Experience, editor and contributor, Peace Corps/USGPO, DC, 1994, 1995
 At Home in the World: The Peace Corps Story, editor and contributor, Peace Corps/USGPO, 1996
 Peace Corps: The Great Adventure, editor and contributor, Peace Corps/USGPO, 1997, 1999

References

External links
 
 Peace Corps Worldwide site, edited and published by John Coyne and Marian Haley Beil
 

1937 births
Living people
Peace Corps volunteers
American male writers
American horror writers
Writers from Chicago
People from Pelham Manor, New York
American expatriates in Ethiopia
Date of birth missing (living people)